Elections were held in the Regional Municipality of Halton of Ontario on October 24, 2022, in conjunction with municipal elections across the province.

Halton Regional Council

Halton Regional Chair
Incumbent chair Gary Carr faced off against former Progressive Conservative MPP for Burlington Jane McKenna and Halton District School Board trustee Andrea Grebenc.

Burlington
List of candidates:

Mayor

Burlington mayor Marianne Meed Ward announced she would be running for re-election on the first day of nominations, May 2. This ended speculation that she would run for Regional Chair.  Running against Meed Ward is perennial candidate Anne Marsden who ran for regional chair in 2018.

Regional & City Councillors

Halton Hills
List of candidates:

Mayor
Incumbent mayor Rick Bonnette did not run for re-election. Running to replace him include Acton businessman Norm Paulsen, town councillors Bryan Leiws, and Ann Lawlor and former East York alderman Ken Paige.

Regional Councillors
Two Regional Councillors are elected in 1 of 2 wards.

Local Councillors
Eight Local Councillors are elected in 1 of 4 wards (2 from each ward).

Milton
List of candidates:

Mayor

Mayor Gord Krantz, the longest serving mayor in Canada won a 19th term in office. He waschallenged by regional councillor Zeeshan Hamid.

Regional Councillors
Four Regional Councillors are elected in 1 of 4 wards.

Local Councillors
Four Local Councillors are elected in 1 of 4 wards.

Oakville
List of candidates:

Mayor

Mayor Rob Burton ran for re-election. It was a re-match of the 2018 mayoral race between him and Julia Hanna, a local restaurant owner and former chamber of commerce chair.

Oakville Town Council

Town and Regional Council

Town Council

References 

Halton
Regional Municipality of Halton